The Development Assessment Commission (DAC) is an independent statutory body which assesses and determines development application pathways and outcomes in the Australian state of South Australia. The relevant types of development assessed are prescribed in the Development Act 1993 and the associated Development Regulations 2008. The Commission has a membership of seven, including a presiding member and a deputy presiding member. Members are appointed by the Governor of South Australia.

Membership 
As of October 2016, current members are:

Former members 
Former members of the DAC from the period 2011 to 2016 include: Ted Byrt (Presiding Member), Betty Douflias (Deputy Presiding Member), Damien Brown, Geoffrey Loveday, Megan Leydon, Carolyn Wigg, John Dagas and Andrew Ford.

References 

Government agencies of South Australia